Will Hamill may refer to two Australian rules footballers:

 Will Hamill (footballer, born 1986), former footballer for Brisbane
 Will Hamill (footballer, born 2000), current footballer for Adelaide

See also
 Billy Hamill (born 1970), American speedway rider
 William Pete Hamill (1935–2020), American journalist, novelist, essayist and editor 
 William Hammill (c.1822–1871), Australian politician